Guadalentín is a river in Spain. It is a tributary of the Segura.

The Guadalentín River flows in the southeastern region of Spain. The Guadalentín River Basin is one of the largest in Spain. The Guadalentín Basin is a flat valley, and comprises the Alto Guadalentín aquifer. The valley is contiguous in the northeast and on the south-east with fault systems.

See also 
 List of rivers of Spain

References

Rivers of Spain
Rivers of the Region of Murcia